Humppaelämää is a 2003 album by the Finnish group Eläkeläiset. This is the first Eläkeläiset album in which none of the tracks are covers.

Track listing 
 Humppaelämää - 3.20
 Katkolla humppa - 2.57
 Humppa-Aatami - 2.16
 Unelmahumppa - 3.35
 Lauantaitanssit - 3.26
 Lusijan Humppa - 3:35
 Keväthumppa - 3.00
 Ona vaan - 3.04
 Humppashokki - 2.51
 Humppaäimä - 3.43
 Pesu- ja linkoushumppa - 2.02
 Humppasäteilyä - 1.59
 Nynnyhumppa - 2.09
 Haudalle kukkia - 1.40

References

2003 albums
Eläkeläiset albums